FX was an Italian TV channel, which launched on 21 May 2006 in Italy on Sky Italia.
It broadcast Italian and US movies and TV series. It also aired a selection of mystery-related documentaries after their passage on the National Geographic Channel, as well as some documentaries produced by the channel itself (e.g. Biancaneve, a report on the cocaine consumption in Central Europe).

Every weekend, the channel aired "Nocturama", a night-long marathon of top network TV series like Burn Notice and It's Always Sunny in Philadelphia.

Due to lowest ratings, the channel was closed on 1 July 2011, following a line-up restyling of Sky Italia. FX's satellite slot planned to host a new Fox International channel by Autumn 2011.

Programs

References

External links
 

Italy
Italian-language television stations
Defunct television channels in Italy
Television channels and stations established in 2006
Television channels and stations disestablished in 2011
2006 establishments in Italy
2011 disestablishments in Italy